Inkerman is a rural town and locality in the Shire of Burdekin, Queensland, Australia.

Geography 
Inkerman bounded on the west by the Bruce Highway and the North Coast railway line.

Although most of the locality is flat land (0- above sea level, Inkerman has the following mountains:

 Charlies Hill 
 Mount Alma 
 Mount Inkerman 

The predominant land use is growing sugarcane with some grazing on native vegetation.

History 
Inkerman Post Office opened by 1915 as a receiving office (known for a time as Inkerman Siding) and closed in 1975.

Inkerman State School opened on 24 November 1915. It closed on 31 December 1974. It was at 22 Wallace Road.

At the 2006 census, Inkerman had a population of 520.

In the 2011 census, Inkerman had a population of 364 people.

In the  the locality of Inkerman had a population of 145 people.

Heritage listings

Inkerman has a number of heritage-listed sites, including:
 Off Charlie's Hill Road: Radar Station, Charlie's Hill

Education
There are no schools in Inkerman. The nearest government schools are Home Hill State School (primary) and Home Hill State High School (secondary), both in neighbouring Home Hill to the north-west.

Attractions

At the top of Mount Inkerman there are views in all directions as well as picnic facilities. Mount Inkerman Road goes to the top of the mountain.

Charlies Hill also has views and the remains of the heritage-listed radar station. Access to the top is via an unsealed road off Charlies Hill Road.

References

External links

 
 

Shire of Burdekin
Localities in Queensland